Kierkegaard Studies Monograph Series is a peer-reviewed monographic series of philosophy covering Søren Kierkegaard's thought and edited by Heiko Schulz, Jon Stewart, and Karl Verstrynge. The series publishes in English, French, and German. It was established in 1997 and is published by Walter de Gruyter on behalf of the International Kierkegaard Society.

See also 
 List of philosophy journals

External links 
 

Biannual journals
Multilingual journals
Journals about philosophers
Publications established in 1997
Works about Søren Kierkegaard
De Gruyter academic journals
Monographic series